Fetlock is the common name in horses, large animals, and sometimes dogs for the metacarpophalangeal and metatarsophalangeal joints (MCPJ and MTPJ). 

Although it somewhat resembles the human ankle in appearance, the joint is homologous to the ball of the foot.  In anatomical terms, the hoof corresponds to the toe, rather than the whole foot.

Etymology and related terminology

The word  literally means "foot-lock" and refers to the small tuft of hair situated on the rear of the fetlock joint.

"Feather" refers to the particularly long, luxuriant hair growth over the lower leg and fetlock that is characteristic of certain breeds.

Formation

A fetlock (a MCPJ or a MTPJ) is formed by the junction of the third metacarpal (in the forelimb) or metatarsal (in the hindlimb) bones, either of which are commonly called the cannon bones, proximad and the proximal phalanx distad, commonly called the pastern bone.  

Paired proximal sesamoid bones form the joint with the palmar or plantar distal surface of the third metacarpal or metatarsal bones, and are rigidly fixed to the proximo-palmar or -plantar edge of the proximal phalanx.

As a hinge joint
The fetlock is a hinge joint, allowing flexion and extension, but only allowing minimal rotation, adduction, or abduction.

Anatomy compared to that of humans
While sometimes the fetlock is colloquially referred to as an "ankle", even by horse experts, that terminology is not correct.  The fetlock is a metacarpophalangeal joint which corresponds to the human upper knuckle, such as that on the ball of the foot.

Problems with the fetlock
 Windpuffs
 Sesamoiditis
 Osselet

In thoroughbred race horses, the fetlock is involved in roughly 50% of catastrophic racing injuries.

See also
 Equine forelimb anatomy
 Equine anatomy

References

Dyce KM, Sack WO, Wensing CJG.  Textbook of Veterinary Anatomy (2nd Ed.). W.B. Saunders, 1996, p. 591.

Horse anatomy